Alaskan of the Year awards are an Alaska tradition dating from 1967.

Alaskan of the Year, Inc., arose out of a 60th birthday party that year, to honor Robert Atwood, publisher of the Anchorage Times. Initially its only award was "Alaskan of the Year", but the "Governor's Award", the "Denali Award", and the "With Great Respect Award" were in turn added to its repertoire. The corporation gave awards until 2002, when decreased membership made continuation impracticable.

Alaskan of the Year awards have since become projects of the Alaska State Chamber of Commerce and of the Governor's Committee on Employment and Rehabilitation for People with Disabilities.

Award winners

Alaskan of the Year, Inc. awards
 1967 – Robert Bruce Atwood
 1969 – Walter Hickel
 1971 – William A. Egan
 1972 – Robert Campbell Reeve
 1974 – Ted Stevens
 1977 – Fred Machetanz
 1978 – John Thomas Kelsey
 1981 – Evangeline Atwood
 1987 – Rick Mystrom (Denali Award)
 1988 – William J. Tobin
 1991 – Lew Williams, Jr. 
 1994 – Jay S. Hammond
 1995 – Joe Redington
 1997 – Archbishop Francis Hurley
 1998 – Al Swalling
 1999 – Edward B. Rasmuson
 1999 – Syun-Ichi Akasofu (Denali Award)
 2000 – Ted Stevens (awarded Alaskan of the Century for the occasion)
 2001 – Augie Hiebert
 2001 – Michael Oleksa (Denali Award)
  – Mahala Ashley Dickerson

Alaska State Chamber of Commerce awards
This event was eventually named the William A. Egan Alaskan of the Year Award.
 2008 – Marc Langland
 2009 – John Shively
 2010 – Helvi Sandvik
 2012 – Joseph E. Usibelli Jr.
 2013 – Nominees: Jim Doyle, Steve Borell, Margy Johnson

Governor's Committee on Employment awards
 2008 – Dan Bigley

References
 http://www.adn.com/2013/08/23/3039695/alaska-chamber-announces-top-business.html#storylink=cpy

1967 establishments in Alaska
American history awards
Lists of people from Alaska